Tamluk is a  town and a municipality in the Indian state of West Bengal. It is the headquarters of the Purba Medinipur district. Though there is some controversy, scholars have generally agreed that present-day Tamluk is the site of the ancient city variously known as Tamralipta or Tamralipti, where Hien Chang, a Chinese traveller, visited the town, is now located on the banks of Rupnarayan River, close to the Bay of Bengal.

History

This ancient kingdom and port city was bounded by the Bay of Bengal in the south, Rupnarayan River in the east and Subarnarekha River in the west. The Rupnarayana is the joint flow of the rivers Dwarakeswar and Silai. The Bay of Bengal and these great rivers with their numerous branches created a prosperous and easy water navigational system fostering commerce, culture and early contacts with the people outside the region. At the same time, these rivers helped to develop the agriculture in this region.

Archaeological remains show continuous settlement from about the 3rd century BC. It was known as Tramralipta (in the Puranas and the Mahabharata), Tamralipta (in the Mahabharata), Tamalika (in historical documents), Tamalitti (in foreigners' descriptions), or Tamoluk (in the British Raj). It was a seaport, now buried under river silt. For this reason, Tamluk has many ponds and lakes remaining today.

In the Mahabharata (Bhishma Parba/Nabam Adhyay), while describing the names of the holiest rivers and kingdoms of India, Sanjay took the name of "Tramralipta" to Dhritarashtra.

Tamluk was also known as Bhivas, in religious texts, and Madhya Desh, as the Middle State of Utkal/Kalinga and Banga.

According to Jain sources, Tamralipti was the capital of the tamralipti janapada and was long known as a port.

Geography

Police station

Tamluk police station has jurisdiction over Tamluk (municipality) and Tamluk  CD Block. Tamluk police station covers an area of 214.14 km2 with a population of 352,748.

Demographics
According to 2011 Indian Census, Tamluk had a total population of 65,306, of which 33,260 were males and 32,046 were females. Population within the age group of 0 to 6 years was 6,180. The total number of literates in Tamluk was 53,318, which constituted 81.6% of the population with male literacy of 85.0% and female literacy of 78.1%. The effective literacy rate of population (7 years and above) of Tamluk was 90.2%, of which male literacy rate was 94.0% and female literacy rate was 86.2%. The Scheduled Castes and Scheduled Tribes population was 4,441 and 201 respectively. Tamluk had 14489 households in 2011.

Transport
Tamluk has two railway stations - Tamluk Junction and Sahid Matangini.

Education

Schools
 Sudhir Memorial Institute Tamluk :- It is an CBSE English - Medium School in Tamluk. It is a Sister Institute of Sudhir Memorial Institute Madhyamgram.
 Matangini Mission School, Tamluk :- It is a Bengali & English - Medium School in Tamluk.
 Tamluk Hamilton High School :- A school under West Bengal board (WBBSE, WBCHSE, and WBSCTE), established on 1852.
 Rajkumari Santanamoyee Girls' High School :- A school under West Bengal board (WBBSE and WBCHSE).
 Tamluk High School :- A school under West Bengal board (WBBSE and WBCHSE).
 Demari High School :- A school under West Bengal board (WBBSE and WBCHSE).
 Tamralipta Vidyapith School : A school under West Bengal board (WBBSE and WBCHSE).
Ratnali Adarsha Valika Vidyalaya : A school under West Bengal board (WBBSE and WBCHSE).
Radhaballavpur Bhima Charan Basu Vidyapith : A school under West Bengal board (WBBSE and WBCHSE).
Kulberia Bhimdeb Adarsha Vidyapith :A school under West Bengal board (WBBSE and WBCHSE).
Bhander Beria Debendra High School : A school under West Bengal board (WBBSE and WBCHSE).
Kakgechia Satyanarayan High School : A school under West Bengal board (WBBSE and WBCHSE).
Jogikhop Girl High School : A school under West Bengal board (WBBSE and WBCHSE).
Banhichar High School : A school under West Bengal board (WBBSE and WBCHSE).
Kelomal Santoshini High School : A school under West Bengal board (WBBSE and WBCHSE).
Nakibasan High School : A school under West Bengal board (WBBSE)
 Tamralipta Public School, an ICSE affiliated school upto standard 12th 
 Daharpur Tapashili High School (WBBSE and WBCHSE)
 Salgechia High School (WBBSE and WBCHSE)

Colleges

 Tamralipta Mahavidyalaya was established in 1948. It is affiliated to Vidyasagar University. It offers courses in arts, science, commerce and education.
 Shahid Matangini Hazra Government College for Women was established at Nimtouri, Tamluk in 2015

 Tamralipto Government Medical College and Hospital, established in 2022. It is affiliated to West Bengal University of Health Sciences

Business

Nursing Home

The Town has recently seen an increase in the number of private Nursing Homes, serving people of the town and mostly of the rural areas in and around Tamluk.

Tamluk also is a growing medical Hub, with chambers of many reputated doctors, that have brought top level diagnosis and facilities to the people of Tamluk and rural villages beside Tamluk.

Some of the most advanced Nursing Homes in Tamluk are 
  Mas Clinic and Hospital 
  APJ Abdul Kalam Super speciality Hospital 
  TUI - Tamluk Urology Institute
  Balaji Nursing Home 
  Paradise Nursing Home

Diagnostic Centres

Along with Nursing homes, top notch diagnostic centres have also developed in the Town, that brings in advance level diagnosis to the rural people

Some of them to be noted are 

  Santra Diagnostic and Medicine Centre 
  Auro MRI 
  MAS Clinic 
  Sri Aurobindo Diagnostic

Landmarks and tourist places

 Rupnarayan river bank: The bank of river Rupnarayan is famous for picnic.
 Devi Barghobhima: Nearly 1150-year-old Temple of Kali named as Devi Bargobhima. This temple is a part of 51 Shakti Peethas. Puranas say that the small finger of left feet of Sati/Parvati fell here when Lord Vishnu cut the sacred Body of Goddess Sati into several pieces to pacify Lord Shiva.
 Tamluk Rajbari: Located on the outskirts of town, the old ruined royal abode of the Bhanj dynasty (Mayur/Peacock), is a tourist destination.
 Rakhit Bati: It is another place to visit in Tamluk. In the beginning of 19th century it was a secret centre of the then revolutionary party Anusilan Samiti & Gupta samiti. The historian late Shri Tailakyanath Rakhit rebuilt this building.
 Geonkhali: At geonkhali river Rupnarayan joins Hooghly river.

Notable people
 Khudiram Bose, young revolutionary and martyr
 Matangini Hazra, Indian independence movement revolutionary and martyr 
 Satish Chandra Samanta, Indian independence movement activist and leader of Tamralipta Jatiya Sarkar
 Ajoy Mukherjee, former chief minister of West Bengal.
 Sushil Kumar Dhara, Co founder of Tamralipta Jatiya Sarkar of British India & after independence he also served the state government as `Industry and Commerce Minister'.
 Paresh Maity, artist.
 Mani Lal Bhaumik, Indian American physicist and best-selling author

Gallery

See also
 Tamluk (Lok Sabha constituency)
 Tamralipta

References

External links

 
 Tamluk Municipality
 Purba Medinipur District Official Website
 Paschim Medinipur District Official Website
 Tamralipta Mahavidyalaya
 On temples of Midnapur

Cities and towns in Purba Medinipur district
Cities in West Bengal